Christopher Brendan Ward IV, better known by the stage name mc chris (stylized in all lower case), is an American rapper, voice actor, comedian, and writer. He is known for his high-pitched voice and for combining his "geek" background with the "gangsta rap" image which resulted in the genre of nerdcore. He has released ten albums, five EPs, one re-release and a tenth anniversary edition of his recordings with the Lee Majors.

Early life
Ward was born in Libertyville, Illinois. He attended the School of the Art Institute of Chicago and New York University's Tisch School of the Arts.

Career

Voice acting

Ward has appeared on, worked behind the scenes on, and contributed original lyrics to, many Williams Street Studios shows on Adult Swim, most notably Aqua Teen Hunger Force. He was a production assistant and starred as the character MC Pee Pants in the episodes "MC Pee Pants", "Sir Loin", "The Last One", and "Little Brittle", and as the young Carl in episode 18. He reprised the role of MC Pee Pants in Aqua Teen Hunger Force Colon Movie Film for Theaters and in the PlayStation 2 video game Aqua Teen Hunger Force Zombie Ninja Pro-Am.

Ward worked on Sealab 2021 as a writer and as the recurring character Hesh Hepplewhite, and as the twins who play Dolphin Boy in a behind-the-scenes type of episode. He worked as a production assistant and writer for The Brak Show (including the episodes "Brakstreet" and "Shadows of Heat") and voiced a character on the episode "Brakstreet". He was a contributing writer for Space Ghost: Coast to Coast with a cameo in the episode "Baffler Meal", and voiced Ward Willoughby in the 2002 pilot for Welcome to Eltingville.

In October 2004, he announced his resignation from Cartoon Network on his blog to focus on his recording career. He returned to Adult Swim as a red Gummi bear named Gummi in Cheyenne Cinnamon and the Fantabulous Unicorn of Sugar Town Candy Fudge. He has worked on a cartoon called The mc chris Cartoon, and plans to work in conjunction with the creators of Metalocalypse, although it will not air on Cartoon Network. Since August 2010, he has created the theme songs for several of the SModcast Internet Radio (S.I.R.) programs, including those for the original SModcast, [Blow Hard, Bagged & Boarded, and Jay & Silent Bob Get Old.

Music
Ward originally performed with The Lee Majors. While he is one of the artists most closely associated with the genre of nerdcore, he had been hesitant to accept the nerdcore label and described his music as "a genre in and of itself". as well as expressing concern over limiting himself to such a narrow audience and subject matter. He has appeared in news stories dealing with nerd culture and nerdcore. Of his nerdcore background, he said, "It's nice that a lot of folks consider me part of it. It's actually embarrassing how I used to think I was the only one playing with Star Wars toys and making music, and it just wasn't true. I have absolutely no problem with the label now." He self-releases with no record label.

Personal life
In July 2012, Ward told the security guards at his show in Philadelphia to eject an audience member who had posted a critical comment on Twitter about his opening act Richie Branson. After receiving criticism from fans, he posted a video in which he cried and apologized for his actions. The fan received a refund, but described in a Reddit post how he felt humiliated by the experience.

Discography

Studio albums
 Life's a Bitch and I'm Her Pimp (2001)
 Knowing Is Half the Hassle (2003)
 Eating's Not Cheating (2004)
 Dungeon Master of Ceremonies (2006)
 MC Chris Is Dead (2008)
 MC Chris Goes To Hell  (2010)
 Race Wars  (2011)
 Foreverrr (2014)
 MC Chris Is Dreaming (2016)
 MC Chris Is Good Music (2018)

Children's albums
 Marshmellow Playground  (2011)
 Marshmellow Campground  (2017)

Compilation albums
 The New York University 8-Track Discography 10th Anniversary Edition (2007)
 Apple Tummy (2009)
 Apple Lung (2012)
  Apple Bum (2017)
 Apple Eye (2022)

Extended plays
 Part Six Part One (2009)
 Part Six Part Two (2009)
 Part Six Part Three (2009)
 Friends (2012)
 Kickstape (2013)
 Foes (2017)

Filmography

Film

Television

References

External links
 
 
 TV.com entry for Chris Ward
 Slashdot Interview (original announcement found here)
 FilmForce Interview
 Interview From September 2005
 Interview from April 2008 on Deviant Nation
 mc chris on The Grave Plot Podcast

1975 births
Living people
American bloggers
American male voice actors
Nerdcore artists
Midwest hip hop musicians
People from Libertyville, Illinois
Rappers from Chicago
School of the Art Institute of Chicago alumni
Tisch School of the Arts alumni
21st-century American rappers
American male bloggers
LGBT people from Illinois
LGBT rappers
Bisexual musicians
Bisexual male actors
Bisexual comedians
American male comedians